The closing ceremony of the 1988 Summer Olympics took place at Seoul Olympic Stadium in Seoul, South Korea, on 2 October 1988 at 19:00 -20:45 KDT (UTC+10).

Ceremony

Opening

Parade of Nations 

The flag bearers of 159 National Olympic Committees arrived into the Seoul Olympic Stadium. The flag bearers from each participating country entered the stadium informally in single file, ordered by ganada order of the Korean alphabet, and behind them marched all the athletes, without any distinction or grouping by nationality.

Concert section

Barcelona 1992 performance
Barcelona, the host city of the 1992 Summer Olympic Games

Speeches and the Games declared closed and the handover of the Olympic flag
SLOOG President Park Seh-jik deliver a speech in Korean, concluded and thank everyone. IOC President Juan Antonio Samaranch deliver  a speech in English, French, awards the Olympic Order in Gold to Park Seh-jik, President of the Seoul Organizing Committee and IOC President declare closed the Games of the XXIV Olympiad in Seoul, and accordance with tradition, and call upon the youth of the world to assemble 4 years from now in Barcelona, to celebrate the Games of the XXV Olympiad. He concluded in Korean. The Mayor of Seoul Kim Yong-rae handover the Olympic flag to IOC President, Juan Antonio Samaranch, who then handed it over to the Mayor of Barcelona, Pasqual Maragall. The flag was raised again on 8 February 1992 in Albertville for the opening ceremony of the 1992 Winter Olympics.

Dignitaries in attendance

Dignitaries from International organizations
 International Olympic Committee – President of the International Olympic Committee Juan Antonio Samaranch and Members of the IOC

Host country dignitaries
 South Korea – 
President of the Seoul Olympic Organizing Committee Park Seh-jik
President of the Republic of Korea Roh Tae-woo
First Lady of the Republic of Korea Kim Ok-suk
Mayor of Seoul Kim Yong-rae

Dignitaries from Abroad
 Spain – President of the Barcelona'92 Olympic Organising Committee and Mayor of Barcelona Pasqual Maragall

Anthems
 National Anthem of Greece
 National Anthem of South Korea
 National Anthem of Spain
 Olympic Hymn

TV coverage

References

Closing Ceremony
Ceremonies in South Korea
Olympics closing ceremonies